Zeewolde is a municipality and a town in the Flevoland province in the central Netherlands. It has a population of approximately 22,000 (2017). It is situated in the polder of Flevoland with the small lake called the Wolderwijd to the east. The area to the west is principally agricultural.

Zeewolde is known for its landscape and nature art; the most well-known art work is Sea Level by Richard Serra, located in the Landschapspark De Wetering.

In the wood Hulkesteinse Bos there is the naturist resort , with recreation bungalows, a camp site, and the possibility of day recreation.

History 
The municipality of Zeewolde was founded in 1984 and is therefore one of the youngest in the Netherlands. The name 'Zeewolde' was always meant to be used during the planning stages, but on various locations. 

Zeewolde's first inhabitants were the so-called 'pioneers', moving in from the 'old land' to the newly created polder in 1979. They were mostly farmers and in the beginning stages deprived of amenities such as electricity or tap water. The planned village was then mostly meant to provide services to the neighbouring farmers. 
Alongside the farmers, two holiday resorts were founded in the area.

In August 1980, the Zeewolde advisory board, headed by Han Lammers who was at the time the head of the OLZIJ, met for the first time. In February 1982, municipal elections were held and the first '' (Structural plan) was drawn, envisaging the village to grow to 15.000 inhabitants. The actual village itself was started in 1983, after which in 1984 Zeewolde became a municipality in its own right. On 23 February 1984, the official first inhabitant of the village of Zeewolde was handed the keys of his house.

Transportation

There are no railway stations in the municipality, but the nearest stations are Harderwijk, Nijkerk and the stations in Almere. There are busconnections to the stations in Harderwijk and Nijkerk, and to the central station in Almere.

Notable people 
 Tom Viezee (born 1950) Christian minister and former politician, Mayor of Zeewolde 1999-2004
 Geke Faber (born 1952) politician, Mayor of Zeewolde 1990-1998 
 Tim Visser (born 1987 in Zeewolde) rugby union player who plays for the Scotland national team
 Sabrina van der Donk (born 1988 in Zeewolde) model who participated in the Miss Earth 2006
 Sep Visser (born 1990 in Zeewolde) rugby union player with Edinburgh Rugby

Gallery

References

External links

 
Municipalities of Flevoland
Populated places in Flevoland